The 1980 New England Patriots season was the franchise's 11th season in the National Football League and 21st overall. They completed the season with a record of ten wins and six losses and finished second in the AFC East Division. Running back Sam Cunningham held out all season, so the Patriots turned to rookie Vagas Ferguson to carry the bulk of the rushing game. Ferguson responded by breaking the team's rookie rushing record. The Patriots would sit at 6–1 near the midway point and were about to make the playoffs. However, the Pats collapsed and won just two of their next seven and finished with a 10–6 record that saw them fall just short of a wild-card berth.

Bill Parcells, then the linebackers coach with the team, has stated that the players on this Patriots team gave him his famous "Tuna" nickname when he asked, "What do you think I am, Charlie the Tuna?"

Offseason

NFL Draft

Staff

Roster

Regular season

Season summary 
The Patriots scored 441 points in 1980, a team record that stood until the 2007 team surpassed it. For the second straight season, they missed the playoffs by one game.

Schedule 

Note: Intra-division opponents are in bold text.

Standings

Notable games 
 Week 1 vs Browns
Steve Grogan fired for three touchdown passes (including a 10-yard pass to Harold Jackson who caught his 500th career reception) and John Smith kicked three field goals as the New England Patriots shut down the Cleveland Browns offense until late in the game and rolled to a 34-17 victory over the Browns. For the day Grogan completed 17 of 26 passes for 277 yards. It was the Patriots first home opening day win since 1977.

 Week 2 vs Falcons 

 Week 3 at Seattle Seahawks:
The game lead tied or changed eight times as Jim Zorn and Steve Grogan combined for 583 passing yards, seven touchdowns, and two picks. Trailing 27–14 after three quarters the Seahawks behind Zorn touchdowns to Steve Largent and Sam McCullum took a 31–30 lead before Grogan found tight end Don Hasselbeck (whose son Matt would quarterback the Seahawks over two decades later) for the game-winning touchdown of a 37–31 final.

 Week 4 vs. Denver Broncos:
The Patriots opened the first of three Monday Night Football appearances on their schedule hosting the Broncos for the fourth time since the AFL-NFL merger. A Matt Robinson touchdown in the first quarter put the Broncos up 7–0, then the game lead changed three times in the next two quarters behind Patriot scores by Vagas Ferguson, Stanley Morgan, and kicker John Smith and an Otis Armstrong touchdown for the Broncos, before the Patriots inched away in the fourth to a 23–14 win. It was the fourth straight win for the home team in the rivalry and would be the Patriots' last win over the Broncos until 1999.

 Week 5 @ New York Jets:
The Patriots edged the Jets 21–11, sacking Richard Todd five times. It had been a rough week leading up to the game for Todd, as he broke the little toe on his left foot after accidentally kicking a table at home, then broke the right little toe after his foot was stepped on by Stan Waldemore on a play-action drill during practice – Waldemore was subbing for Randy Rasmussen after Rasmussen was injured earlier in practice.

 Week 6 vs. Miami Dolphins:
The Patriots and Dolphins had split their season series the previous four seasons, and 1980 proved no different. The Patriots hammered the Dolphins at Schaefer Stadium 34–0 as Don Calhoun and Allan Clark had rushing touchdowns, Steve Grogan and Matt Cavanaugh each had a touchdown throw, and kicker John Smith kicked two field goals. The Dolphins had four fumbles and recovered all four, but also threw four picks.

 Week 7 at Colts

 Week 8 at Bills

 Week 9 vs Jets

 Week 10 at Houston Oilers
In their second Monday Night Football game the Patriots fell behind 24–6 at halftime as they faced an Oilers squad that included two players who'd haunted the Pats during their Oakland Raiders days – Ken Stabler and Dave Casper. The Patriots managed four touchdowns in the second half and recovered an onside kick late in the fourth quarter, but Grogan was intercepted in the endzone and thus the Oilers had the game 38–34.

 Week 11 vs Rams

 Week 12 vs Colts

 Week 13 at San Francisco 49ers:
Steve Grogan started despite injuries to both knees because backup Matt Cavanaugh (a future Niners backup for Joe Montana) was coming off knee surgery. Grogan was picked off six times in a 21–17 loss and "I got crucified in the newspapers, but no one knew I was playing on two bad knees."

 Week 14 at Miami Dolphins:
The Dolphins got revenge in a 16–13 overtime win at the Miami Orange Bowl. The Patriots clawed to a 13–6 lead in the fourth quarter, then the Dolphins forced overtime with a David Woodley throw to Nat Moore in the fourth. John Smith attempted to kick the game-winning field goal, but had the kick blocked, then Uwe von Schamann of the Dolphins won it with a 23-yard field goal in the extra quarter. The game, though, wound up taking a back seat to the announcement by Howard Cosell that John Lennon had been shot and killed.

 Week 15 vs Bills

 Week 16 vs. New Orleans Saints:
Needing a win and outside help for a playoff berth, the Patriots outdueled the Saints 38–27 behind three Matt Cavanaugh touchdown throws and rushing scores by Don Calhoun and Mosi Tatupu. Running back Jack Holmes threw a touchdown to fellow RB Jimmy Rogers as the Saints clawed to a 10–0 first quarter lead, but the lead was gone before halftime. Archie Manning threw for 301 yards and a score to Wes Chandler against a Patriots organization his sons Peyton and Eli would battle in another time.  A Pittsburgh win in the ensuing Monday Night game versus San Diego would have earned the Patriots a wild card, but the Chargers led it wire to wire to clinch the #1 seed in the AFC.

References

See also 
 New England Patriots seasons

New England Patriots
New England Patriots seasons
New England Patriots
Sports competitions in Foxborough, Massachusetts